The Quarry   (French: La faille) is a 1998 Belgian mystery drama film written and directed by Marion Hänsel, based on the 1995 novel of the same name by Damon Galgut. It jointly won Grand Prix des Amériques, the main prize at the Montreal World Film Festival ex aequo with Full Moon.

References

External links
 

1998 films
1998 drama films
1990s English-language films
1990s mystery drama films
Belgian mystery drama films
English-language Belgian films
Films based on South African novels
Films directed by Marion Hänsel
Films set in South Africa